"Papa Loves Mambo" is a popular song written by Al Hoffman, Dick Manning, and Bix Reichner and published in 1954.

The best-known version was recorded by Perry Como with Mitchell Ayres's orchestra in New York City on August 31, 1954. The U.S. release peaked at No. 4 on the Billboard chart in January 1955. The recording was part of a wave of popular mambo music in the U.S alongside songs like "Mambo Italiano".

Other recordings
Bing Crosby also recorded the song in 1954 for use on his radio show and it was subsequently included in the CD El Senor Bing [Deluxe Edition] issued in 2013.
Johnnie Ray – a single release for Columbia Records (1955).
Nat King Cole – a single release for Capitol Records (1954).

In popular culture
The Perry Como version was originally planned to be used in the 1985 movie Back to the Future as the song that played when Marty McFly enters the 1955 version of Hill Valley, but was scrapped by the producers in favor of The Four Aces' version of "Mister Sandman". Instead, "Papa Loves Mambo" plays on Biff Tannen's car radio as he drives to the Enchantment Under the Sea dance in the 1989 sequel Back to the Future: Part II.

The Perry Como version was also featured in the Season 13 episode of The Middle titled "The Par-Tay."  The Nat King Cole version was featured in the first episode of Season 2 of Only Murders in the Building. The episode was titled "Persons of Interest" and was telecast on June 28, 2022. 

The Perry Como version was also featured in the 2007 action game "Bioshock", published by 2K. 

The Perry Como version was also featured as the credits song for the 2010 film Red

Chart positions

References

External links
The Story of "Papa Loves Mambo"

1954 songs
Songs written by Al Hoffman
Songs written by Dick Manning
Perry Como songs